The Best Years is a 2020 biografic drama film directed by Gabriele Muccino.

The film, which was initially to be titled I migliori anni, began to be filmed on 3 June 2019 between Cinecittà, Rome, Naples, and Ronciglione and continued for the next nine weeks.

The soundtrack includes the song "Gli anni più belli" by Claudio Baglioni.

Plot
Giulio, Gemma, Paolo and Riccardo have been friends since adolescence. In 40 years their aspirations, successes and failures are told, and the film also telling the changes to Italy and the Italians.

Cast

Release
The Best Years premiered on 13 February 2020 in Italy.

Reception

Box office
, the film grossed $7 million worldwide, against a production budget of $9.5 million.

See also
 C'eravamo tanto amati

References

External links
 

2020 films
2020 drama films
Italian drama films
2020s Italian-language films
2020s pregnancy films
Films set in 2020
Films set in Italy
Films set in Rome
Films set in Naples
Films directed by Gabriele Muccino
Italian pregnancy films
2020s Italian films